Jerome County is a county in the U.S. state of Idaho. As of the 2010 Census the county had a population of 22,374. The county seat and largest city is Jerome. The county was created by the Idaho Legislature on February 8, 1919, by a partition of Lincoln County.  It was named after either Jerome Hill, a developer of the North Side Irrigation Project, his son-in-law Jerome Kuhn, or his grandson Jerome Kuhn, Jr.

Jerome County is part of the Twin Falls, ID Micropolitan Statistical Area.

The Minidoka Relocation Camp, one of ten Japanese American internment camps set up during World War II, was located in Jerome County, six miles (9.6 km) north of Eden.

Geography

History
Jerome county's settlements are among Idaho's youngest. While Jerome County was located quite close to the Oregon Trail and subsequent stagecoach lines, it was also divided from them by the 500-ft (152 m) deep Snake River Canyon. The depth of the canyon also eliminated the possibility of drawing water for farming operations. Together, those factors made the area unattractive to early Idahoans looking to settle during the territorial and early statehood era. A ferry commenced operation at Shoshone Falls on April 15, 1884, facilitating travel between the railroad and settlements south of the Snake River.

The Schodde settlement on Jerome County's western border north of Milner was established as the Schoddie Precinct under Lincoln County with a 1900 census population of 24. Completion of the Milner Dam and associated Northside Canal in 1905 brought a water supply to the north side of the Snake River that also brought farmers to the region. Eden and Hazelton were settled starting in 1905. Settlement at Jerome commenced September 30, 1907 and the Idaho Southern Railway reached Jerome on December 28, 1908. By the 1910 Census, Jerome Village contained 970 residents having been incorporated in 1909. Also by that time, Lincoln County established two precincts of Hillsdale (400 residents) and Jerome (2,032 residents).  The towns of Eden and Hazelton were part of the Hillsdale precinct and the Schoddie precinct ceased to exist.  By the 1920 Census, Eden and Hazelton also were incorporated as villages.

Jerome, Eden, and Hazelton were all part of Lincoln County at their formation. Eden and Hazelton became part of Minidoka County at its creation in 1913. Jerome County became the 43rd of Idaho's 44 counties on February 8, 1911. It is three days older than Caribou County.

Adjacent counties
 Lincoln County - north
 Gooding County - west
 Twin Falls County - south
 Cassia County - southeast
 Minidoka County - east

Major highways
 Interstate 84
 US 93
 SH-25
 SH-79

National protected areas
 Minidoka National Historic Site

Demographics

2000 census
As of the census of 2000, there were 18,342 people, 6,298 households, and 4,805 families residing in the county. There were 6,713 housing units at an average density of 11 per square mile (4/km2). The racial makeup of the county was 86.99% White, 0.23% Black or African American, 0.69% Native American, 0.27% Asian, 0.05% Pacific Islander, 9.84% from other races, and 1.94% from two or more races.  17.17% of the population were Hispanic or Latino of any race. 15.4% were of English, 15.3% German, 11.6% American and 6.2% Irish ancestry.

There were 6,298 households, out of which 39.10% had children under the age of 18 living with them, 63.80% were married couples living together, 7.60% had a female householder with no husband present, and 23.70% were non-families. 19.50% of all households were made up of individuals, and 8.70% had someone living alone who was 65 years of age or older.  The average household size was 2.89 and the average family size was 3.33.

In the county, the population was spread out, with 31.50% under the age of 18, 8.90% from 18 to 24, 27.10% from 25 to 44, 20.20% from 45 to 64, and 12.30% who were 65 years of age or older.  The median age was 33 years. For every 100 females, there were 104.60 males.  For every 100 females age 18 and over, there were 104.50 males.

The median income for a household in the county was $34,696, and the median income for a family was $39,083. Males had a median income of $28,036 versus $20,194 for females. The per capita income for the county was $15,530.  13.90% of the population and 10.70% of families were below the poverty line.   17.90% of those under the age of 18 and 9.90% of those 65 and older were living below the poverty line.

2010 census
As of the 2010 United States Census, there were 22,374 people, 7,540 households, and 5,656 families residing in the county. The racial makeup of the county was 80.0% white, 1.3% American Indian, 0.3% black or African American, 0.3% Asian, 0.1% Pacific islander, 15.8% from other races, and 2.1% from two or more races. Those of Hispanic or Latino origin made up 31.0% of the population. In terms of ancestry, 16.7% were German, 11.4% were English, 8.8% were American, and 7.0% were Irish.

Of the 7,540 households, 42.5% had children under the age of 18 living with them, 58.7% were married couples living together, 9.6% had a female householder with no husband present, 25.0% were non-families, and 20.3% of all households were made up of individuals. The average household size was 2.95 and the average family size was 3.39. The median age was 31.7 years.

The median income for a household in the county was $39,188 and the median income for a family was $45,947. Males had a median income of $30,889 versus $23,383 for females. The per capita income for the county was $16,947. About 12.0% of families and 15.5% of the population were below the poverty line, including 23.1% of those under age 18 and 7.6% of those age 65 or over.

Communities

Cities
 Eden
 Hazelton
 Jerome

Unincorporated community
Greenwood

Politics

See also
National Register of Historic Places listings in Jerome County, Idaho
 USS Jerome County (LST-848)

References

External links
County website
County Parcel Map
 

 
Idaho counties
1919 establishments in Idaho
Populated places established in 1919
Twin Falls, Idaho metropolitan area